Statistics of Swedish football Division 3 for the 1993 season.

League standings

Norra Norrland 1993

Mellersta Norrland 1993

Södra Norrland 1993

Norra Svealand 1993

Östra Svealand 1993

Västra Svealand 1993

Nordöstra Götaland 1993

Nordvästra Götaland 1993

Mellersta Götaland 1993

Sydöstra Götaland 1993

Sydvästra Götaland 1993

Södra Götaland 1993

Footnotes

References 

Swedish Football Division 3 seasons
4
Sweden
Sweden